Sea A (stylized as Sea☆A) was a Singaporean-Malaysian Japanese idol group under the label Lantis Records and managing agency Horipro. The group consists of four members: Beryl, Valerie, Wynnie, and Estelle. They were formed in 2011 and released four singles and one mini-album. Their first album was released in 2013. The four girls were picked by Anisong Diva May'n's manager from Moe Moe Kyun Maid Cafe at the annual Anime Festival Asia (AFA) held in Singapore. Sea*A is also one of SOZO's platforms.

After their debut in 2011, Sea*A was invited to perform at the prestigious Animax Musix held annually in Japan at the Yokohama Arena. Sea*A had their own program on Japan-exclusive Animax Studio Musix called "Sea*A's Choice", where they introduced their favorite anime.

In 2012, Sea*A conducted a South-East Asian regional audition for new members. However, there was no new member selected in the end as the agency concluded that there were "no appropriate candidates with sufficient ability to fulfill [their] objectives of the audition".

On 1 July 2013, it was announced on their official website that Sea*A had officially disbanded. They also announced that Valerie would continue her activities as a solo artist.

In addition, Sea*A's Valerie was also the host and co-producer of AFA Channel's WOW JAPAN.

Origins of group name
The group was originally named Sea☆A, which stands for South East Asia ☆ Anime. The star represents for the rising stars they aspire to become. Their name was later changed to Sea*A.

Members
Beryl Teo (Berylベリル ) holds the leadership position in Sea*A. Her number, "16" is the sum of all of her family's birth months.

Valerie Tang (Valerieヴァレリー) Her number, "1", stands for "one for all, all for one" and "one heart; one dream; one passionate Sea*A". Valerie is the only one who has a solo in their second single Deli-Deli-Delicious, called Renai Circulation, a cover from the anime Bakemonogatari.

Wynnie Teoh (Wynnieウイニー) is the most fluent in Japanese out of the four members. Before she was in Sea*A, Wynnie was already famous as a model, actress and cosplayer (Sakana Sashimi). She was featured in OTACOOL2 and recognised by Danny Choo.

Estelle Lim (Estelleエステル) was the lead vocalist for Singapore's first J-pop girl group MYnT (Miyake, Yoshimi and Tomomi) before it quietly disbanded in 2010. Her number is 19.

Discography

Albums
 Sea*A (2013)

Mini-albums
 WE ARE DREAM SHOOTERS!! (2012)

Singles
 DREAM SHOOTER (2011)
 DELI-DELI☆DELICIOUS (2011)
 Friendship Birthday ~Arashi No Yoru Ni~ (2012)
 エントリー！Entry! (2012)

Notable anime
 Cardfight!! Vanguard (Ending)
 Toriko (Ending)
 Arashi No Yoru Ni (One Stormy Night) (Opening)
 Cardfight!! Vanguard Asia Circuit Hen (Ending)

Concerts and public appearances

Concerts
 12 November 2011 Anime Festival Asia Singapore 2011- Rock Your Soul Day 2 (DREAM SHOOTER was used as theme song as well)
 23 November 2011 ANIMAX MUSIX Fall 2011
 10 June 2012 Anime Festival Asia Malaysia 2012- Super Anisong Genki Live Day 2
 2 September 2012 Anime Festival Asia Indonesia 2012- Super Anisong Stage Day 2
 4 November 2012 ANIMAX MUSIX Taiwan 2012
 11 November 2012 Anime Festival Asia Singapore 2012- Electric Groove Diamond Stage (エントリー！was used as theme song as well)

Public appearances
 May’n Asia Tour 2011: United! (Opening Act)
 30 September 2012 Bushiroad Cardfight!! Vanguard Media Event in Singapore
 4 March 2012 Bushiroad Cardfight!! Vanguard Festival in Singapore at Suntec City
 29 May 2012 Trade Event (Animax Asia with Sony Entertainment Television Asia) at Hilton Kuala Lumpur Hotel Malaysia
 31 May 2012 Trade Event (Animax Asia with Sony Entertainment Television Asia) at Hotel Pullman Jakarta Central Park
 15 November 2012 4th Single エントリー！Release event at Tokyo Dome City Laqua Garden Stage

Milestones
 First Singaporean-Malaysian J-pop/Anisong girl group
 First Non-Japanese group to perform at Anime Festival Asia
 First Anisong Idol group to release a single in different languages (Friendship Birthday~Arashi No Yoru Ni~) Jap/Eng/Chi
 First Singaporean-Malaysia Anisong Idol group to perform at the prestigious ANIMAX MUSIX

References

 Sea*A Official Site SEA SITE Retrieved on 26 January 2013.
 Performances/Interviews on Animax Studio Musix  Retrieved on 11 May 2013.
 Performances at Animax Musix  Retrieved on 11 May 2013.
 Performances/Appearances at Anime Festival Asia Singapore  Retrieved on 11 May 2013.
 WOW JAPAN JAPANESE POP CULTURE VIDEO CHANNEL | AFA Channel! Retrieved on 11 May 2013.
 AFA CHANNEL AFA Channel! | Bringing you the best Japanese pop culture content! Retrieved on 11 May 2013.
 Sea*A Pre-debut at Moe Moe Kyun Maid Cafe  Retrieved on 11 May 2013.
 SOZO SOZO : IMAGINE, CREATE. Retrieved on 11 May 2013.
 Anime Festival Asia Singapore 2012 (Sea*A) AFA : Anime Festival Asia 2012 Retrieved on 11 May 2013.
 Anime Festival Asia Malaysia 2012 (Sea*A) Retrieved on 11 May 2013.
 Anime Festival Asia Indonesia 2012 (Sea*A)  Retrieved on 11 May 2013.
 Straits Times Interview  Retrieved on 4 February 2012.
 IN Interview Featured in Strait Times IN (distributed to only subscribing schools) - Sea*A DAISUKI~ Retrieved 1 September 2012.
 TEENAGE

External links
 Interview  Retrieved 21 August 2012.
 KotakGame Interview Berita : [AFA ID 2012] Interview with Sea☆A | KotakGame Retrieved 2 September 2012.
 Arashi no Yoru ni TV Anime Cast, Singers Revealed Anime News Network Retrieved 12 May 2013
 News: Cardfight Festival Suntec Tropic Atrium News: Cardfight!! Festival @ Suntec Tropics Atrium on WS@NK-DS Retrieved 12 May 2013

Japanese pop music groups
Malaysian musical groups